Wilson Lake may refer to

Canada
 Wilson Lake, a lake of Nova Scotia

United States
 Wilson Lake (Alabama)
 Wilson Lake (Cleveland County, Arkansas), a lake of Cleveland County, Arkansas
 Wilson Lake (Columbia County, Arkansas), a lake of Columbia County, Arkansas
 Wilson Lake (Nevada County, Arkansas), a lake of Nevada County, Arkansas
 Wilson Lake (Pulaski County, Arkansas), a lake of Pulaski County, Arkansas
 Wilson Lake (Randolph County, Arkansas), a lake of Randolph County, Arkansas
 Wilson Lake (Kansas)
 Wilson Lake (Maine)
 Wilson Lake, part of the Elk River Chain of Lakes Watershed, Michigan
 Wilson Lake, a lake in Mineral County, Montana
 Wilson Lake (Wisconsin), seven lakes, including:
 Wilson Lake (Iron County, Wisconsin)

See also 
 Lake Wilson (disambiguation)